Strikeforce: Melendez vs. Thomson was a mixed martial arts event promoted by Strikeforce. The event took place at the HP Pavilion at San Jose in San Jose, California on Friday, June 27, 2008.  The main event was the long awaited match between lightweights Gilbert Melendez and Josh Thomson for the Strikeforce Lightweight title.

Results

See also 
 Strikeforce (mixed martial arts)
 List of Strikeforce champions
 List of Strikeforce events
 2008 in Strikeforce

References

External links
Strikeforce Official website

Melendez vs. Thomson
2008 in mixed martial arts
Mixed martial arts in San Jose, California
2008 in sports in California